Health Care for America Now (HCAN) is a political advocacy group of more than 1,000 organizations that joined together in 2008 in a successful effort to promote legislation to reform the United States health care system and extend medical benefits to most of the population that is currently uninsured. The Patient Protection and Affordable Care Act (PPACA or ACA) was signed into law by President Barack Obama on March 23, 2010, and HCAN was credited with being a "major contributor" to its passage. After enactment of the law, HCAN shifted its activities to defending the law from opposition attacks and advocating for the law before Congress and state regulatory agencies.

Organization
HCAN is directed by a steering committee that consists of a wide range of tax-exempt public charities, advocacy organizations, labor unions and civil rights groups. HCAN is a 501(c)(4) issue advocacy organization that runs national and state-based legislative and regulatory campaigns through grassroots action, public education, aggressive media outreach, research and policy analysis. It works in cooperation with its 501(c)(3) partner, Health Care for America Education Fund, a project of the Tides Center, a public charity.

The "national organizations" that are members of the umbrella group is composed of the following organizations:

9 to 5, National Association of Working Women
Abundant Children and Family Services
Adventists Community Services
AFL–CIO
AIDS in Action
Alliance for a Just Society
Alliance for Retired Americans
American Academy of Family Physicians
American Academy of Nursing
American Academy of Pediatrics
American Family Voices
American Federation of State, County and Municipal Employees
American Federation of Teachers
American Federation of Television and Radio Artists
American Medical Student Association
American Nurses Association
Americans for Democratic Action
Americans United for Change
AskSlim.org
Asian and Pacific Islander American Health Forum
Association for Better Insulation
Black Women’s Health Imperative
Brave New Films
Bus Federation
Cafemom.com
Campaign for America's Future
Campaign for Community Change
Campus Progress Action
CareTALK
Center for American Progress Action Fund
Center for Rural Affairs
Center for Science in the Public Interest
Center for Social and Economic Justice
Child Advocate Network
Children’s Defense Fund
Communications Workers of America
Committee of Interns and Residents/SEIU Healthcare
Commonwealth Institute
Communications Workers of America
Community Action Partnership
Community Service Society
Clergy Strategic Alliances, LLC
CREDO Mobile
Democracy for America
Democracia Ahora
Direct Care Alliance
Eagle Medical Services
Human Rights Campaign
Leadership Center for the Common Good
Leadership Conference on Civil Rights
League of United Latin American Citizens
MoveOn.org
National Abortion Federation
National Association for the Advancement of Colored People
National Council of Jewish Women
National Council of La Raza
National Congress of American Indians
National Education Association
National Women's Law Center
Planned Parenthood Federation of America
Progressive Future
Rock the Vote
Service Employees International Union
UAW
United Food and Commercial Workers
USAction
Women's Voices. Women Vote
Working America

Funding and activities
Funding for HCAN's operations has come from its member organizations, individual contributions and foundations, including the Atlantic Philanthropies. HCAN also received $5 million from billionaire George Soros. In their $50 million campaign for passage of the ACA, HCAN mounted a multi-faceted field program that included television advertising events, demonstrations, and advocacy meetings with government officials across the country.

HCAN assembled a network of state-based advocacy groups to carry the message from the ground up to members of Congress—an effort widely credited with strengthening like-minded organizations. HCAN published numerous research reports and conducted extensive media outreach during the legislative campaign. An outside evaluation praised HCAN's "effective and disciplined strategic planning, decision-making and implementation; well-thought-out benchmarks; strong and effective internal leadership, efficient allocation of resources to staff and to fund a wide-ranging field program; resilience to buffeting external events; and its creation of opportunities for supporters to meaningfully engage with the movement for reform through multiple points of entry."

Major actions
HCAN's two largest public demonstrations occurred on June 25, 2009, when thousands of people from around the nation converged on Capitol Hill in Washington, D.C., for a rally in support of health reform, and on March 9, 2010, when more than 5,000 people rallied on the street outside a health insurance industry conference at the Ritz-Carlton Hotel in Washington, D.C. HCAN led grassroots online activists, conducted news conferences and published reports on health insurance industry profits, executive compensation, concentration of market power, and mistreatment of consumers and health care providers.

Affordable Care Act
HCAN did not achieve one of its central goals, the creation of a so-called public option, a government-run health plan that would introduce greater competition into local health insurance markets, nearly all of which are dominated by one or two large companies. Republicans joined with  conservative democrats to block the public option and a proposal to allow Americans over 55 years old to pay unsubsidized premiums to the government to purchase Medicare benefits, which now are provided to the elderly and disabled through a single-payer system that picks up the vast majority of patients' costs.  Despite those losses, HCAN supports the Affordable Care Act and frequently declares that the ACA's impact will be extensive in the policy and political arenas.

Activities since enactment of Affordable Care Act
In 2010, as a result of political and legal challenges to the ACA, in 2010 HCAN transitioned from campaigning for passage of the law to a broad campaign to fully implement health care reform at the state and federal level. HCAN's executive director, Ethan Rome, has repeatedly declared in media statements and in frequent writings on Huffington Post that Congress and the Obama administration should carry out all implementation activities. HCAN has said it intends to do this by identifying significant public policy issues as they arise and taking responsibility to lead campaigns to address them in collaboration with the diverse membership of its coalition. These efforts include pushing for strong accountability measures for insurance companies and countering what HCAN claims is false information that has been systematically disseminated by opponents of the law. HCAN continues to prepare reports that they believe highlight insurance industry excesses and abuses and to educate the public about developments related to implementation of the law by state and federal agencies. 

In the fall of 2010, HCAN co-produced a short, two-part satirical comedy video starring Jack Black and America Ferrera about professional "Mis-informant" Nathan Spewman, who spreads lies about the Affordable Care Act as part of an industry propaganda campaign.

References

External links
Health Care for America NOW! official website

Healthcare reform advocacy groups in the United States
Internet-based activism
American political websites
501(c)(4) nonprofit organizations
Health campaigns
2008 establishments in the United States